Aleksandr Krokhmal (born 22 November 1977) is a Turkmenistani-Kazakhstani football striker of Ukrainian and Russian descent who played for the clubs Megasport, Pakhtakor, Borysfen, Ordabasy, Zhetysu.

Krokhmal played three games for the Kazakhstan national football team.

Career statistics

International

References

1977 births
Living people
Sportspeople from Ashgabat
Turkmenistan footballers
Kazakhstani footballers
Kazakhstan international footballers
Kazakhstan Premier League players
FC Nisa Aşgabat players
Pakhtakor Tashkent FK players
FC Ordabasy players
FC Zhetysu players
Association football forwards
FC Megasport players